Scott Steketee (born March 13, 1947) is an American former rower. He competed in the 1967 Pan American Games (gold medal), the 1967 European Rowing Championships (silver medal), and the men's coxed eight event at the 1968 Summer Olympics (6th place). He graduated from Harvard University.

References

External links
 

1947 births
Living people
American male rowers
Olympic rowers of the United States
Rowers at the 1968 Summer Olympics
Rowers from Detroit
Harvard Crimson rowers
Pan American Games gold medalists for the United States
Pan American Games medalists in rowing
Rowers at the 1967 Pan American Games
Medalists at the 1967 Pan American Games